The King's Doctor (lit. Horse Doctor) is a 2012 South Korean television series depicting Baek Gwang-hyeon (1625–1697), Joseon Dynasty veterinarian, starring Cho Seung-woo and Lee Yo-won. It aired on MBC from October 1, 2012 to March 25, 2013 on Mondays and Tuesdays at 21:55 for 50 episodes. The historical/period epic drama commemorated MBC's 51st anniversary.

Filmed at MBC Dramia in Gyeonggi Province, The King's Doctor was directed by Lee Byung-hoon, known for his previous works Hur Jun, Jewel in the Palace, Yi San and Dong Yi. This marked the first television drama for actor Cho Seung-woo in his 13-year film and stage career.

Plot
The life of a Joseon-era low-class veterinarian specializing in the treatment of horses, who rises to become the royal physician in charge of the King's health.

Cast

Main characters
Cho Seung-woo as Baek Kwang-hyun 
Ahn Do-gyu as young Kwang-hyun 
Lee Yo-won as Kang Ji-nyeong 
Roh Jeong-eui as young Ji-nyeong/Young-dal 
Son Chang-min as Lee Myung-hwan
Yoo Sun as Jang In-joo
Lee Sang-woo as Lee Sung-ha
Nam Da-reum as young Lee Sung-ha
Lee Soon-jae as Ko Joo-man 
Han Sang-jin as King Hyeonjong
Kim So-eun as Princess Sukhwi
Jo Bo-ah as Seo Eun-seo

Supporting characters

Kang Ki-young as Horse Doctor
Kim Chang-wan as Jung Sung-jo 
Jeon No-min as Kang Do-joon, Kwang-hyun's father
Choi Su-rin as Joo In-ok
Kim Hyeseon as Queen Inseon
Lee Hee-do as Choo Ki-bae
Maeng Sang-hoon as Oh Jang-bak
Ahn Sang-tae as Ja-bong
In Gyo-jin as Kwon Suk-chul 
 as Yoon Tae-joo
 as Park Dae-mang
 as Jo Jung-chul
Shin Gook as Shin Byung-ha
 as Court Lady Kwak
 as Ma Do-heum
Lee Ga-hyun as Queen Myeongseong
Joo Jin-mo as Sa-am
Uhm Hyun-kyung as So Ka-young
Park Hyuk-kwon as Baek Seok-gu
Hwang Young-hee as Baek Seok-gu's wife
Yoon Hee-seok as Seo Doo-shik
 as Jo Bi
 as Hong Mi-geum
Oh In-hye as Jung Mal-geum
Seo Beom-shik as Kang Jung-doo
Im Chae-won as Lee Myung-hwan
Na Sung-kyun as Park Byung-joo
 as Choi Ga-bi
Heo Yi-seul as Park Eun-bi
Yoo In-suk as farmer
Han Choon-il as doctor at royal horse stable
 as doctor at royal horse stable
Kim Ho-young as Oh Kyu-tae
 as First Secretary
So Hyang as Kyu-soo
Jung Dong-gyu as Shim Moon-kwan
 as Ji-pyung
Lee Jong-goo as Lee Myung-hwan's stepfather
Yang Han-yeol as young Ji-nyeong's friend
 as Doo-mok
 as Guru Uigeumbu
Shin Joon-young as Byun
 as Joseon's officer
Choi Eun-seok as Joseon's officer
 as Joseon's officer
Park Gi-san as Joseon's officer
 as Joseon's officer

Guest appearances

Jung Gyu-woon as Crown Prince Sohyeon
Kyung Soo-jin as Crown Princess Minhoe of the Kang clan
Sunwoo Jae-duk as King Injo
Choi Deok-moon as King Hyojong
 as Kim Ja-jeom
Jang Young-nam as Do-joon's wife and Kwang-hyun's mother
Seo Hyun-jin as So-yong Jo, later Gwi-in Jo
 as Lee Hyung-ik
 as Boo Tae-soo
Lee Hee-jin as Woo-hee
 as Soo-bo, Woo-hee's older brother
 as Choi Hyun-wook
 as Hong Yoon-shik
Kang Han-byeol as little crown prince, later King Sukjong
Jung Yoon-seok as the child (ep 8)

Episode ratings
 In the table below,  represent the lowest ratings and  represent the highest ratings.
 NR denotes that the drama did not rank in the top 20 daily programs on that date.

Awards and nominations

International broadcast

References

External links
 Horse Doctor Official MBC website 
 
 

MBC TV television dramas
Korean-language television shows
2012 South Korean television series debuts
2013 South Korean television series endings
Television series set in the Joseon dynasty
South Korean medical television series
South Korean historical television series
Television series by Kim Jong-hak Production
Television series by AStory